Hohe Wurzel, at , is the second-highest peak in the Osburger Hochwald in the Hunsrück, Rhineland-Palatinate, Germany.

Mountains and hills of Rhineland-Palatinate